Hugh Dunn was a Scottish footballer. His year of birth is uncertain, being given as 1878 in some sources and 1875 in others. He played at right-back for Johnstone, Preston North End, Bristol Rovers, and Burslem Port Vale. Whilst with Bristol Rovers, he won the Southern Football League championship in 1904–05.

Career
Dunn played for local club Johnstone, before moving south of the border to play for Preston North End. He joined Bristol Rovers in 1901, as the club posted a ninth-place finish in the Southern League in 1901–02. The "Pirates" then finished fifth in 1902–03 and third in 1903–04, before winning the league title in 1904–05 after finishing five points clear of runners-up Reading. The "Gas" then dropped down to eighth place in 1905–06. In his five seasons at the Eastville Stadium, Dunn played 155 matches, scoring one goal. He signed with Burslem Port Vale of the Football League Second Division in August 1906. He played 27 league and four FA Cup games, before losing his first team spot in March 1907. He was not given a chance to win it back however, as the Vale went into liquidation at the end of the 1906–07 season.

Career statistics
Source:

Honours
Bristol Rovers
Southern Football League: 1904–05

References

1870s births
1947 deaths
People from Johnstone
Footballers from Renfrewshire
Scottish footballers
Association football fullbacks
Johnstone F.C. players
Preston North End F.C. players
Bristol Rovers F.C. players
Port Vale F.C. players
Southern Football League players
English Football League players